View from the Artist's Window is a painting from 1825 by Martinus Rørbye, a Danish Romantic genre, landscape and architecture painter. It is in the Statens Museum for Kunst in Copenhagen. The painting is considered one of the highlights of the Danish Golden Age painting.  It incorporates themes and symbols that resonated with  its audience.

Background

Rørbye was born in Norway, but grew up in Denmark, where he studied painting at the Royal Danish Academy of Fine Arts for just under ten years. He was influenced by the artists Johann Christian Dahl, Horace Vernet and Caspar David Friedrich. His teacher at the academy was Christian August Lorentzen (1746–1828), but he took additional private lessons from Christoffer Wilhelm Eckersberg.
  
Rørbye became a fashionable artist through selling paintings to the Danish royal family, and by numerous commissions by the middle classes of Copenhagen for portraits set in interiors.  An inveterate traveler, he made the Grand Tour in 1834–37, travelling to Paris, Rome, Sicily, Greece and Turkey. In Paris he studied French contemporary art. Later he became a professor at the Copenhagen Academy. Following Eckersberg's example, Rørbye was essentially a realist. His pictures were factual but displayed a uniquely sympathetic view of the people he painted.

View from the Artist's Window was made as Rørbye was about to leave his childhood homea time when his ideas about art were changing through his studies with Eckersberg and the influence of Romanticism.

Description and themes

The painting depicts the artist's view from his window at his parents' house. The view is of Flådestation Holmen, a naval dockyard, with a ketch and four warships, one of which is under construction on the slips. Two ropewalks are visible, as is the masting house with its crane. On the ledge in front of the windows are several plants in pots, and two plaster casts of feet, one a child's and the other an adult's. One of the plants is a cutting, encased in a glass tube.

Like most paintings of the Romantic era, the painting has many underlying symbolic meanings. The window open towards the light; the ships in the harbour on their way to foreign destinations symbolize the longing for an unknown calling; the cage with the imprisoned bird above the window occupies a transitional position between the inside and the world outside the parental home, in this case a prison for the artist longing to explore the world outside. On the windowsill, potted plants symbolize the different stages of growth of human life – for Romantic painters the image of creative Genius was often symbolized by a plant or flowers growing from a seed into a big plant that develops towards the sky, having its own cycle of life, setting seeds of its own, nourished by water and light. A sketchbook with empty pages – also placed on the windowsill – is waiting to be filled, while the inside of the room where the artist is painting is reflected in the oval mirror hanging in the window.

References

Notes

Citations

Paintings by Martinus Rørbye
Copenhagen in art
1825 paintings
Paintings in the collection of the National Gallery of Denmark
19th-century paintings in Denmark
Books in art
Ships in art